Liujia Township is a township in Fuchuan Yao Autonomous County, Guangxi, China.

Administrative division
As of 2016, the township is divided into one community and nine villages: 
 Liujia Community 
 Fengling 
 Changxijiang 
 Xinshi 
 Xiawan 
 Shiba 
 Longyan 
 Dongjing 
 Yangxin 
 Dawan

Geography
The township is situated at southwestern Fuchuan Yao Autonomous County. It is surrounded by Fuyang Town on the north, Gongcheng Yao Autonomous County on the west, Guishi Reservoir on the east, and Zhongshan County on the south.

The Guishi Reservoir is a reservoir located in the township.

Economy
The local economy is primarily based upon agriculture and forestry. Agricultural crops include grains, vegetables, medicinal materials, and Cassava. The region abounds with iron and rare-earth mineral.

Transportation
The township is connected to two highways: the China National Highway G538 and the Provincial Highway S203.

References

Bibliography

Townships of Hezhou